Chishawasha is the name of a Roman Catholic Jesuit mission located about 25 km east of Harare, Zimbabwe. The mission was founded by the Jesuit priest Father Francis Richartz in 1892 on a large farm. The mission has 3 schools - Chishawasha Primary School, a secondary school for girls called St Dominic's' Chishawasha as well as a mostly-boys school called St. Ignatius College. There is a Regional Major Seminary for diocesan priests from Zimbabwe and Botswana, and Silveira House, a Jesuit centre for religious training and education, is also located there.

Background 
The Jesuit Mission arrived in Zimbabwe between 1890 and 1898 along with the Pioneer Column serving as chaplains. In recognition to this service, Cecil John Rhodes gave them a farm which they used for developing a mission centre.

References  

Buildings and structures in Harare Province
Catholic Church in Zimbabwe
Religious organizations established in 1892
Chishawasha